Bréhan is a commune in the Morbihan department of Brittany in northwestern France.

Population
Inhabitants of Bréhan are called Bréhannais in French.

See also
Communes of the Morbihan department

References

External links
  
 
Mayors of Morbihan Association 

Communes of Morbihan